The Journal of Popular Culture (JPC) is a peer-reviewed academic journal that publishes academic essays on all aspects of popular or mass culture. It is published six times a year, printed by Wiley-Blackwell. As of Summer 2022, the editor is Novotny Lawrence. One of the cofounders was Jack Fritscher.

The JPC is the official publication of the Popular Culture Association. The organization holds a national conference annually, usually within the continental United States, with the American Culture Association.  There are also several regional conferences held annually.

The Journal of Popular Culture began publication in 1967. At the time, it was located at Bowling Green State University and edited by Ray B. Browne.  It later became headquartered at Michigan State University in East Lansing, Michigan.

Abstracting and indexing 
The journal is abstracted and indexed in:
 Academic Search Premier 
 Arts and Humanities Citation Index
 MLA International  Bibliography
 ProQuest Central
 SocIndex
 Web of Science

According to the Journal Citation Reports, the journal has a 2019 impact factor of 0.199.

References

External links
 The Journal of Popular Culture at Wiley-Blackwell
 The Journal of Popular Culture at Michigan State University

Bimonthly journals
History journals
Sociology journals
Popular culture journals
Wiley-Blackwell academic journals